Paul John Franks (born 3 February 1979) is a former English professional cricketer. He played a single One Day International (ODI) as a right-arm pace bowler for England, and had a long career in county cricket for Nottinghamshire.

Playing career
The Nottinghamshire-born all-rounder first broke into the side as a 17-year-old in 1996. He remained a key member of the Nottinghamshire side for over a decade, despite injuries and loss of confidence. He was part of both 2005 and 2010's Nottinghamshire County Championship winning sides.  He was played extensively for the club's Second XI, helping them win the county trophy in 2015, and captained them after his retirement from first-class cricket, which he announced in late 2015. Franks only won one cap for England, in 2000 at Trent Bridge versus the West Indies cricket team, but he missed the 2001 and 2002 campaigns with a recurring knee injury. Franks has previously been the captain of the under-19s, and was the vice-captain of the team with whom he won the Under-19s World Cup in 1998.

Coaching career
In January 2015, prior to the 2015 World Cup, Franks was made an assistant coach of the UAE national team, with a concentration on fielding. In July 2016, following the resignation of Aaqib Javed, he was appointed acting head coach, a position which he held until being succeeded by Owais Shah in November 2016. He was the second Englishman to coach the UAE, after Colin Wells (who was head coach from 2009 to 2010).
In 2022, Franks takes up head coach role at Central Punjab.

References

External links
Paul Franks at ECB
Franks revives memories of lost generation - John Colley - The Independent

1979 births
Living people
English cricketers
England One Day International cricketers
People educated at Southwell Minster School
Cricketers from Sutton-in-Ashfield
Canterbury cricketers
Nottinghamshire cricketers
NBC Denis Compton Award recipients
Mid West Rhinos cricketers
English expatriate sportspeople in New Zealand
English expatriate sportspeople in Zimbabwe
English expatriate sportspeople in the United Arab Emirates
Coaches of the United Arab Emirates national cricket team
English cricket coaches
First-Class Counties Select XI cricketers